Johann Pierre du Plessis is a South African international lawn bowler.

Bowls career
In 2009 he won the fours gold medal at the Atlantic Bowls Championships.

He won a gold medal in the Men's triples at the 2010 Commonwealth Games with Wayne Perry and Gidion Vermeulen.

References

Living people
1960 births
Commonwealth Games gold medallists for South Africa
Bowls players at the 2010 Commonwealth Games
South African male bowls players
Commonwealth Games medallists in lawn bowls
Medallists at the 2010 Commonwealth Games